WQIX may refer to:

WQIX-LD, a low-power television station (channel 25) licensed to Vidalia, Georgia
WCID, a radio station (100.9) licensed to Horseheads, New York, which held the call sign WQIX from 1969 to 1995
WPGO, a radio station (820 AM) licensed to Horseheads, New York, which held the call sign WQIX from 1996 to 1997
WKHT, a radio station (104.5 FM) licensed to Belton, South Carolina, which held the call sign WQIX from 1998 to 2000